The Uppland Regiment, designations Ing 3, S 1 and S 1/Fo 47, was a Swedish Army signal regiment that traced its origins back to the 19th century. It was disbanded in 2006. The regiment was garrisoned in Uppland.

History 
The regiment has its origins in the field signal (later telegraphy) company raised  in 1871 and subordinated to Pontoon Battalion in 1875. The company was redesignated as the Field Telegraph Corps and with designation Ing 3 (3rd Engineer Regiment) in 1902 when it became independent. An aircraft squadron was created in 1916 and split from the unit in 1926, this squadron would later become the Swedish Air Force.

The unit was reorganised and renamed to Signal Regiment with the designation S 1 (1st Signal Regiment) when the Swedish Army Signal Troops became a separate arm in 1937. A in 1915 detached company of the unit later became Norrland Signal Regiment and another in 1944 detached company later became Göta Signal Regiment.

It was renamed to Uppland Signal Regiment in 1957 and in 1974 to Uppland Regiment. The same name was used by the infantry regiment Uppland Regiment, although the signal regiment does not trace its origins from this regiment, even though the victory names were transferred to the signal regiment.

In 1974, the regiment gained the new designation S 1/Fo 47 as a consequence of a merge with the local defence district Fo 47. The designation was changed back to S 1 in 2000 when the defence district was disbanded. Uppland Regiment was disbanded in 2006 but was replaced by the Command and Control Regiment which took the role that the regiment previously had.

Organisation
?

Heraldry and traditions

Coat of arms
The coat of the arms of the Uppland Regiment (S 1/Fo 47) 1974–2000 and the Uppland Regiment (S 1) 2000–2006. Blazon: "Gules, the provincial badge of Uppland, a mound or, banded and ensigned with a cross-crosslet. The shield surmounted a cluster of bolts, or".

Colours, standards and guidons
Uppland Regiment presented two regimental colours.

First colour of S 1
The colour was presented to the regiment by His Majesty the King Carl XVI Gustaf in Enköping on 4 November 1976. The colour is drawn by Mrs Westberg and is embroidered by hand in insertion technique by the company Libraria. Blazon: "On blue cloth in the centre the lesser coat of arms of Sweden, three open yellow crowns placed two and one. In the first corner a mullet with a cluster of rays, all yellow. In the lower part of the rays, placed upon a cluster of yellow bolts, the provincial coat-of-arms of Uppland; gules an orb, banded and ensigned with a cross-crosslet, or. The shield ensigned with a royal crown proper."

Second colour of S 1
The colour was presented to the regiment in Enköping by the Supreme Commander, general Johan Hederstedt on 20 May 2000. The colour replaced an older which was presented to the former Royal Uppland Regiment (I 8) in 1955 and which was handed over to S 1 in 1957. The colour is drawn by Kristina Holmgård-Åkerberg and embroidered by hand in insertion technique by Sofie Thorburn. Blazon: "On red cloth the provincial badge of Uppland; a yellow orb, banded and ensigned with a cross-crosslet. On a yellow border at the upper side of the colour, battle honours (Varberg 1565, Narva 1581, Lützen 1632, Warszawa 1656, Frederiksodde 1657, March Across the Belts 1658, Rügen 1678, Düna 1701, Kliszow 1702, Holovczyn 1708, Helsingborg 1710, Svensksund 1790) in red."

Medals
In 2000, the Upplands regementes (S 1) förtjänstmedalj ("Uppland Regiment (S 1) Medal of Merit") in gold and silver (UpplregGM/SM) of the 8th size was established. The medal ribbon is divided in red and yellow moiré.

In 2000, the Uppland-Västmanlands försvarsområdes (Fo 47/48) minnesmedalj ("Uppland-Västmanland Defence District (Fo 47/48) Commemorative Medal") in silver (UpplVästmlfoSMM) of the 8th size was established. The medal ribbon is of red moiré with two thinly placed yellow stripes on the middle.

Commanding officers

 1902–1904: Nils Gustaf Stedt (also commanding officer of Ing 1)
 1904–1907: Georg Frans Herman Julius Juhlin-Dannfelt
 1907–1912: Broder Sten A:son Leijonhufvud
 1912–1915: Carl Adolf Alfred Murray
 1915–1920: Karl Albert Byron Amundson
 1920–1924: Erik Conrad Erikson
 1924–1925: Karl Albert Byron Amundson
 1925–1927: Carl Eggert Nauclér
 1928–1932: Torsten Friis
 1932–1942: Gottfried Hain
 1942–1945: Harald Hægermark
 1945–1948: Nils Åke Sundberg
 1948–1957: Casa Crafoord
 1957–1963: Sven Almqvist
 1963–1968: Ivar Syberg
 1968–1971: Lennart Ljung
 1971–1974: Arne Risling
 1974–1976: Curt W Helmfrid
 1976–1982: Carl-Ivar Lindgren
 1982–1990: Fredrik Lilliecreutz
 1990–1999: Lennart Johansson
 1999–2000: Björn Karlsson
 2000–2004: Lars-Olof G Johansson
 2004–2006: Mats O Blom

Names, designations and locations

See also
List of Swedish signal regiments

Footnotes

References

Notes

Print

Further reading

Military communications regiments of the Swedish Army
Disbanded units and formations of Sweden
Military units and formations established in 1902
Military units and formations disestablished in 2006
Signals intelligence agencies
Electronic warfare
1902 establishments in Sweden
2006 disestablishments in Sweden
Stockholm Garrison
Uppsala Garrison
Enköping Garrison